The Benjamin Britten was an international train service linking Amsterdam with London. The train service was named after English composer, conductor and pianist Benjamin Britten.

History
The Benjamin Britten was one of the initial services of the 1987 EuroCity network. It was operated as a boat train, the first part Amsterdam – Hook of Holland by train, the second Hook of Holland – Harwich by boat and the final part, Harwich – London, by train.

The eastbound EC Benjamin Britten and the westbound EC Admiraal de Ruijter had timed connections with the day boats. The return services had timed connections with the night boats.

Each of these trains lost its EuroCity label after one year of service because it did not meet the EuroCity criteria for service quality; sometimes other rolling stock was used and the on-board catering was minimal from the start. However, both trains also remained in the timetable, as InterCity services.

Formation (consist)
The Nederlandse Spoorwegen used three coupled Koplopers between Amsterdam and Hook of Holland. Ferries of Stoomvaart Maatschappij Zeeland  (the ) or Sealink (the MS St Nicholas) provided the shipping. British Rail used its most modern InterCity coaches hauled by Class 86 locomotives on the Harwich – London portion.

References

Works cited

Further reading

External links
 NVBS Op de Rails - 2008 - Nr. 2 (Februari) – includes image of 86 254 with the Benjamin Britten at Harwich, 15 July 1987

International named passenger trains
Named passenger trains of the Netherlands
Named passenger trains of British Rail
EuroCity
Railway services introduced in 1987
1987 establishments in the United Kingdom
1987 establishments in the Netherlands